Nemipterus bathybius, commonly known as the yellowbelly threadfin bream, is a marine fish native to the western Pacific Ocean.

References

Fish of Thailand
Fish of Malaysia
Fish of Australia
Fish described in 1911
Fish of the Pacific Ocean
bathybius